Felix Alex "Ray" Bucek (January 31, 1922 – August 13, 1965) was an American football guard and linebacker who played one season with the Pittsburgh Steelers of the NFL. He was drafted by the "Steagles" in the 19th round of the 177th pick in the 1943 NFL draft. He played college football at Texas A&M University for the Texas A&M Aggies football team.

References

External links

1922 births
1965 deaths
Pittsburgh Steelers players
American football guards
American football linebackers 
Players of American football from Texas
Texas A&M Aggies football players
People from Schulenburg, Texas